Lukou Town is a town in Changsha County, Changsha, Hunan Province, China. It administers eight villages and two communities.

Divisions of Changsha County
Changsha County